The 1969 King's Cup finals were held from November 19 to November 28, 1969, in Bangkok. This was the second edition of the international football competition. Indonesia were set to defend the championship they won in 1968. In the final, South Korea won the tournament as they defeated the defending champions in the final.

The edition scrapped the Group Allocation stage and was increased to eight teams with seven being national teams and one being a representative side.

The Groups
Two groups of four teams.
Winners and runner up qualifies for the semi-finals.

Fixtures and results

Group A

Group B

Semi-finals

3rd Place Match

Final

Winner

References

King's Cup
Kings Cup, 1969
Kings Cup, 1969
International association football competitions hosted by Thailand